The men's football tournament at the 2012 Summer Olympics was held in London and five other cities in Great Britain from 26 July to 11 August. Associations affiliated with FIFA were invited to enter their men's U-23 teams in regional qualifying competitions, from which 15 teams, plus the hosts Great Britain, reached the final tournament. Men's teams were allowed to augment their squads with three players over the age of 23. It was the first men's Olympic football tournament to feature a team representing Great Britain since the 1960 Summer Olympics in Rome. The competition also marks the return of Uruguay to an Olympic Championship since 1928 when it became two-time champions.

The gold medal was won by Mexico who defeated Brazil 2–1 in the final.

Schedule
The match schedule of the men's tournament.

Qualification
Each National Olympic Committee may enter one men's team in the football tournament. The 2004 and 2008 Olympic gold-medallists Argentina failed to qualify, after finishing third in the South American qualifying tournament.

Locations are those of final tournaments, various qualification stages may precede matches at these specific venues.

Venues
Six venues were used during the tournament with Wembley Stadium in London hosted the Final.

Squads

For the men's tournament, each nation submitted a squad of 18 players, 15 of whom had to be born on or after 1 January 1989, and three of whom could be overage players. A minimum of two goalkeepers (plus one optional alternate goalkeeper) had to be included in the squad.

Match officials
On 19 April 2012, FIFA released the list of match referees that would officiate at the Olympics.

Draw
The draw for the tournament took place on 24 April 2012. Great Britain, Mexico, Brazil and Spain were seeded for the draw and placed into groups A–D, respectively. The remaining teams were drawn from four pots with teams from the same region kept apart.

Group stage
The competing countries were divided into four groups of four teams, denoted as groups A, B, C and D. Teams in each group will play one another in a round-robin basis, with the top two teams of each group advancing to the quarter-finals.

All times are local, British Summer Time (UTC+1).

Group A

Group B

Group C

Group D

Knockout stage

In the knockout stage, if a match was level at the end of normal playing time, extra time was played (two periods of fifteen minutes each) and followed, if necessary, by a penalty shoot-out to determine the winner.

Bracket

Quarter-finals

Semi-finals

Bronze medal match

Gold medal match

Statistics

Goalscorers

With six goals, Leandro Damião of Brazil is the top scorer in the tournament. In total, 76 goals were scored by 49 different players, with none of them credited as own goal.

6 goals
  Leandro Damião

5 goals
  Moussa Konaté

4 goals
  Oribe Peralta

3 goals

  Neymar
  Mohamed Salah
  Jerry Bengtson
  Yūki Ōtsu
  Giovani dos Santos

2 goals

  Mohamed Aboutrika
  Daniel Sturridge
  Kensuke Nagai
  Park Chu-young
  Ismail Matar

1 goal

  Dzmitry Baha
  Renan Bressan
  Andrey Varankow
  Danilo
  Hulk
  Oscar
  Alexandre Pato
  Rafael
  Rômulo
  Sandro
  Marwan Mohsen
  Pierre-Emerick Aubameyang
  Craig Bellamy
  Ryan Giggs
  Aaron Ramsey
  Scott Sinclair
  Roger Espinoza
  Mario Martínez
  Maya Yoshida
  Koo Ja-cheol
  Kim Bo-kyung
  Ji Dong-won
  Javier Aquino
  Javier Cortés
  Jorge Enríquez
  Marco Fabián
  Héctor Herrera
  Abdelaziz Barrada
  Zakaria Labyad
  Chris Wood
  Ibrahima Baldé
  Innocent Emeghara
  Admir Mehmedi
  Rashed Eisa
  Nicolás Lodeiro
  Gastón Ramírez

Discipline
Red cards

  Alex Sandro
  Henri Ndong
  Saad Samir
  Wilmer Crisanto
  Roger Espinoza
  Zakarya Bergdich
  Abdoulaye Ba
  Iñigo Martínez
  Oliver Buff

Final ranking

Controversies

Queues

For the first matchday at St James' Park, there were long queues at the box office, leading to fans missing some of the game. A spokesman for Ticketmaster said: "We saw extremely high numbers of spectators arriving at St James' Park to purchase football tickets on the day of the event. While Ticketmaster is contracted to manage the box offices at Olympic venues, the staff numbers at those venues are determined by LOCOG. We will continue to work closely with LOCOG to ensure that the box office staff levels are sufficient to meet the demands for ticket sales and collection". LOCOG described the situation as "totally and completely 100% unacceptable", and after changes were made in the process, the issue was reportedly avoided for the second round of matches.

During the matches held at the Wembley Stadium on 29 July, fans were subjected to long queues at the concession stands in the ground after Visa's card payment system crashed, leaving cash payment as the only alternative. The situation was compounded by the fact that, as Visa had been granted exclusive rights to the Olympics, other cards could not be accepted as payment, and the number of cash machines in the stadium had been reduced after 27 that worked on the LINK system had been removed to be replaced by eight that could only be used by Visa cards.

There were several problems relating to transport for events held at the Millennium Stadium in Cardiff. There was severe congestion at Cardiff Central railway station when Great Britain played South Korea; and the bronze medal match also had rail disruption when a retaining wall collapsed onto the tracks.

Player sent home
Swiss footballer Michel Morganella was sent home by the Switzerland team following their 2–1 loss against South Korea after he sent a tweet that, according to the director of Swiss Olympic Committee Gian Gilli, "discriminated, insulted and violated the dignity of the South Korean football team and people".

Great Britain football teams
Following the criticism against Scottish female player Kim Little, for choosing not to sing the British national anthem "God Save the Queen" because of her national identity, other Scottish and Welsh players, Ryan Giggs, Craig Bellamy and Ifeoma Dieke, also attracted comment in the media for remaining silent. Giggs, the Great Britain men's captain, later said: "The problem is the British anthem is the same as the English anthem and if you're a Welshman or a Scotsman it's difficult".

LOCOG also apologised after an error in the official match programme for the first game mistakenly described Welsh player Joe Allen as being English.

Political statement made by Park Jong-woo
After South Korea defeated Japan in the bronze medal match at the Millennium Stadium in Cardiff on 10 August, South Korean player Park Jong-woo walked around the field holding a banner with a political message written in Korean, "독도는 우리 땅!" (dokdo neun uri ttang, lit.: "Dokdo is our territory"). This incident occurred on the same night after South Korean President Lee Myung-bak had visited the islands which both South Korea and Japan claim as their territory. The IOC and FIFA reviewed the evidence, since FIFA statutes prohibit political statements being made by athletes at Olympic events. The IOC barred Park from the bronze medal ceremony and did not permit him to receive his medal. In addition, it asked FIFA to discipline Park, and stated that it may decide on further sanctions at a later date. IOC president Jacques Rogge told reporters: "We will take a possible decision of what will happen with the medal later". FIFA failed to reach a conclusion on the case at a meeting at its Zürich headquarters held on 5 October, and the disciplinary committee discussed the case again on the following week, then again failed to reach a verdict. After that, the Korean Olympic Committee (KOC) announced that Park would receive his bronze medal. The case was heard again by the committee on 20 November, and FIFA finally decided and announced on 3 December to suspend Park for two matches after he was considered to have breached the FIFA Disciplinary Code and the Regulations of the Olympic Football Tournaments. FIFA also imposed a warning on the Korea Football Association and reminded it of its obligation to properly instruct its players on all the pertinent rules and applicable regulations before the start of any competition, in order to avoid such incidents in the future. The Korea Football Association was warned that should incidents of such nature occur again in the future, the FIFA Disciplinary Committee may impose harsher sanctions on the Korea Football Association.

See also
 Football at the 2012 Summer Olympics – Women's tournament

References

External links
Official website 
FIFA official website
RSSSF Summary
FIFA Technical Report

 
Men's tournament